Daniil Medvedev defeated Sam Querrey in the final, 6–4, 6–2, to win the singles tennis title at the 2021 Mallorca Championships. It was Medvedev's first career grass court final and singles title on the ATP Tour, and he dropped just one set en route to the victory. Querrey was contesting for his first title in four years.

This was the inaugural edition of the tournament.

Seeds
The top four seeds received a bye into the second round.

Draw

Finals

Top half

Bottom half

Qualifying

Seeds

Qualifiers

Qualifying draw

First qualifier

Second qualifier

Third qualifier

Fourth qualifier

References

Main draw
Qualifying draw

2021 ATP Tour